Ghita Mezzour is the Moroccan Delegate-Minister to the Head of Government in charge of Digital Transition and Administration Reform. She was appointed as minister on 7 October 2021.

Education
Mezzour took her master's degree from the École Polytechnique Fédérale de Lausanne in Switzerland and her doctorate at Carnegie Mellon University in Philadelphia.

Career 
She is an expert in Artificial Intelligence and she teaches at the International University of Rabat. She was appointed as a minister by Mohammed VI of Morocco in 2021. Mezzour's appointment was made emphasising Morocco's commitment to digitising its public institutions and to "boost women's empowerment and inclusion in policy making".

References 

Living people
21st-century Moroccan politicians
Carnegie Mellon University alumni
École Polytechnique Fédérale de Lausanne alumni
Moroccan politicians
Government ministers of Morocco
Year of birth missing (living people)